Sulla can refer to:

 Sulla, a Roman dictator in 82 BC
 Sulla, the cognomen used by members of Cornelii Sullae, a family within the gens Cornelia and relatives of the Roman dictator
 Sulla (plant), a genus of legumes
 A Celtic goddess also called Sulis
 Sullah Upazila, a place in Bangladesh